The Bulgarian National Unification (BNO) is a Bulgarian nationalist political party. The leader of the party is Georgi Georgiev-Goti.

History 
On December 1, 2013, the Association of Bulgarian Pensioners, Bulgarian Criminal Detachment, Association of Argoecological Producers and others. establish the Bulgarian National Unification party with Georgi Georgiev as chairman. The party describes itself as center-left and patriotic. BNO states that it will fight for a complete revision of the status quo, raising the standard of living by stimulating the economy and offering better conditions for small and medium-sized businesses.

On March 20, 2014, BNO was officially registered by the court.

BNO participated in several elections, but received more media attention in 2016, when it nominated Mityo Pishtova for presidential candidate. In 2019, Evgenia Baneva was nominated as an MEP, but soon after they withdrew their support for her.

In February 2021, BNO became a mandate holder and submitted its lists for the parliamentary elections in April to the Civil Platform "Bulgarian Summer", which was established by businessman Vasil Bozhkov.

Electoral results 
 BNO participated in the elections in April 2021 as a mandate holder of the Bulgarian Summer.

Party logos

References

External links 
 

2013 establishments in Bulgaria
Organizations based in Sofia
Nationalist parties in Bulgaria
Political parties established in 2013